Stone Love is the third studio album by American singer Angie Stone. It was released on July 6, 2004, by J Records. The album debuted at number 14 on the US Billboard 200 with 53,000 copies sold in its first week.

Track listing

Notes
  signifies a co-producer
  signifies an associate producer

Sample credits
 "Stoned Love (Intro)" is a cover of the 1970 single by The Supremes.
 "I Wanna Thank Ya" contains re-sung lyrics from "Come into My Life" by Joyce Sims and interpolations of "All This Love" by DeBarge.
 "Lovers' Ghetto" contains elements from "Adventures in the Land of Music" by Dynasty.
 "You're Gonna Get It" contains samples from "La-La (Means I Love You)" by The Delfonics.
 "Come Home (Live with Me)" contains samples from "Come Live with Me" by Dorothy Ashby.
 "You Don't Love Me" contains excerpts from "We've Only Just Begun" by Curtis Mayfield.
 "That Kind of Love" contains samples from "(I'm Going By) The Stars in Your Eyes" by Ron Banks and The Dramatics.

Personnel
Credits adapted from the liner notes of Stone Love.

Musicians

 Angie Stone – vocals ; background vocals ; additional keyboards 
 Snoop Dogg – vocals 
 Jazze Pha – vocal ad-libs 
 Floetry – vocals 
 Warryn "Baby Dubb" Campbell – instruments, programming 
 Sean Cooper – sound design 
 Harold Lilly – background vocals 
 Nisan Stewart – all instruments 
 Craig X. Brockman – all instruments 
 John "Jubu" Smith – all instruments 
 Missy Elliott – background vocals 
 Tweet – background vocals 
 Diamond Stone – background vocals ; vocals 
 Betty Wright – background vocals ; vocals 
 Anthony Hamilton – vocals 
 Jonathan Richmond – all instruments (as Jon Rych) ; background vocals ; additional vocal performance 
 Eric Walls – guitar 
 Juanita Wynn – background vocals 
 Baby Paul – drum programming 
 Rufus Blaq – drum programming 
 Jamel "Melekeyz" Oliver – keyboards 
 Prince Charles Alexander – keyboards 
 Khadejia Bass – background vocals 
 Stephanie Bolton – background vocals 
 Walter (DJ Walt) Millsap III – instruments, programming 
 Tamara Savage – background vocals 
 Joi Campbell – background vocals 
 Supa Ugly K-Love – additional programming 
 Jamal Peoples – Fender Rhodes 
 Steve Bethany – guitar 
 Crystal Johnson – background vocals 
 T.H.C. – vocals 
 Andreao "Fanatic" Heard – all instruments, programming

Technical

 Angie Stone – production ; executive production
 Jonathan Richmond – production 
 Jazze Pha – production 
 Arnold Wolfe – recording 
 Tim Donovan – recording ; mixing 
 Yutaka Kawana – recording assistance ; recording ; mixing assistance 
 Serban Ghenea – mixing 
 John Hanes – additional Pro Tools engineering 
 Tim Roberts – engineering assistance 
 Warryn "Baby Dubb" Campbell – production 
 Harold Lilly – co-production 
 Bruce Buechner – recording 
 Ann Mincieli – recording 
 Manny Marroquin – mixing 
 Sandra Campbell – project coordination 
 Missy Elliott – production 
 Nisan Stewart – co-production 
 Craig X. Brockman – co-production 
 John "Jubu" Smith – co-production 
 Carlos Bedoya – recording 
 Marcella Araica – recording assistance 
 Paul Falcone – mixing 
 Daniel "Boom" Wierup – recording 
 Rob Barahona – recording assistance 
 Rufus Blaq – production, recording 
 Prince Charles Alexander – production, recording, mixing 
 Jamel "Melekeyz" Oliver – associate production 
 Louis Alfred III – recording 
 Elai Tubo – recording 
 Walter (DJ Walt) Millsap III – production, recording 
 David Lopez – recording 
 Rabeka Tunei – mixing assistance 
 Supa Ugly K-Love – production 
 Andre Netto – recording assistance 
 Bill Importico – recording 
 Andreao "Fanatic" Heard – production 
 Sherrod Barnes – production 
 Eddie Krakaur – recording 
 Herb Powers Jr. – mastering
 Peter Edge – executive production

Artwork
 Alli – art direction, design
 Marc (Poppa) Baptiste – photography
 Chris LeBeau – art department production

Charts

Weekly charts

Year-end charts

Release history

Notes

References

2004 albums
Albums produced by Craig Brockman
Albums produced by Jazze Pha
Albums produced by Missy Elliott
Albums produced by Warryn Campbell
Albums recorded at Westlake Recording Studios
Angie Stone albums
Arista Records albums
J Records albums